Cinctura branhamae is a species of sea snail, a marine gastropod mollusk in the family Fasciolariidae, the spindle snails, the tulip snails and their allies.

Description

Distribution
This species occurs in the Gulf of Mexico.

References

 Rosenberg, G., F. Moretzsohn, and E. F. García. 2009. Gastropoda (Mollusca) of the Gulf of Mexico, Pp. 579–699 in Felder, D.L. and D.K. Camp (eds.), Gulf of Mexico–Origins, Waters, and Biota. Biodiversity. Texas A&M Press, College Station, Texas.
 Snyder M.A., Vermeij G.J. & Lyons W.G. (2012) The genera and biogeography of Fasciolariinae (Gastropoda, Neogastropoda, Fasciolariidae). Basteria 76(1-3): 31–70.

Fasciolariidae
Gastropods described in 1951